Malaysia competed in the 2009 Southeast Asian Games held in Vientiane, Laos from 8 to 18 December 2009. Malaysia competed in 21 of the 25 sports consisting 197 male and 151 female athletes, 154 male officers and 28 female officers. Dr. Ramlan Abdul Aziz, the Director General of National Sports Institute was the Chef de Mission of Malaysia. The contingent won 40 gold medals, 40 silver and 59 bronze to finish fourth in the medal standings. Excellent performance was shown by the men football team whom won the gold medal after 20 years and women's badminton team in team event after 34 years. Daniel Bego has been selected as the Best Male Athlete of the 25th SEA Games winning five gold medals and one bronze medal.

Medal summary

Medals by sport

Medallists

Aquatics

Diving

Men

Women

Swimming

Men

Women

Football

Men's tournament
Group A

Semifinal

Gold medal match

Women's tournament
Group stage

Volleyball

Men's tournament
Group B

Fifth and sixth place match

References

2009
Nations at the 2009 Southeast Asian Games